Christian Mba (born 12 October 1999) is a Nigerian professional footballer who plays as a forward for Albanian club Partizani Tirana.

Club career

Partizani Tirana
On 29 January 2023, Mba signed a three-and-a-half-year contract with Kategoria Superiore club Partizani Tirana and received squad number 90. Partizani Tirana reportedly paid a €180 thousand transfer fee. His debut with Partizani Tirana came a day later in a 1–1 home draw against Egnatia after coming on as a substitute at 69th minute in place of Alfred Mensah.

References

External links

1999 births
Living people
Sportspeople from Delta State
Association football forwards
Nigerian footballers
Nigerian expatriate footballers
Expatriate footballers in Kosovo
Nigerian expatriate sportspeople in Kosovo
Expatriate footballers in Albania
Nigerian expatriate sportspeople in Albania
Football Superleague of Kosovo players
KF Trepça'89 players
Kategoria Superiore players
FK Partizani Tirana players